Marcia Jones may refer to:
 Marcia Jones (writer) (born 1958), American writer of children's books
 Marcia Jones (artist) (born 1972), professor and artist
 Marcia Mae Jones (1924–2007), American actress
 Marcia Jones-Smoke (born 1941), American sprint canoer